Erythranthe alsinoides is a species of monkeyflower known by the common names wingstem monkeyflower and chickweed monkeyflower. It was formerly known as Mimulus alsinoides.

Distribution and habitat
It is native to western North America from British Columbia to the Klamath Mountains of far northern California, where it grows in moist and wet wooded habitat, such as moss beds and rocky stream banks.

Description 
Erythranthe alsinoides is an annual herb producing an erect stem up to about 15 centimeters tall. The oval green to red-tinged leaves are slightly to obviously toothed.  Less than 2 centimeters long with 3 to 5 prominent veins on the upper surface, they are oppositely arranged about the small stem.

Each flower arises on an erect reddish pedicel. The base of the flower is surrounded by a slightly hairy red calyx of sepals. The yellow corolla of the flower has two lobes on its upper lip and three on its lower. The lower lip has a large red spot and there are usually other red marks in the corolla. The fruit is a small capsule.

References

External links

Mimulus alsinoides - Photo gallery

alsinoides
Flora of the West Coast of the United States
Flora of California
Flora of British Columbia
Flora of the Klamath Mountains
Bird food plants
Flora without expected TNC conservation status